The Miles M.17 Monarch was a British, light, touring aeroplane of the 1930s. It was a single-engine, three-seat, cabin monoplane with a fixed, tailwheel undercarriage.

Development
The last civil type produced by Phillips and Powis before the war, the Monarch was a development of their earlier Whitney Straight. Compared to its sibling. the Monarch had an enlarged fuselage, allowing provision of a third seat in part of what had been the luggage space.

Operational history
Eleven aircraft were built between 1938 and 1939, six of these to British customers, the rest going to export.

On the outbreak of war five of the British-registered machines were impressed by the Air Ministry; one machine belonging to Rolls-Royce acquired camouflage paint but remained in its owner's service. All but one of these survived the war, though a Dutch-registered aeroplane (PH-ATP) was destroyed in the Luftwaffe raid on Schiphol on 10 May 1940. One aircraft, OY-DIO, was on the Danish register until 9 Sept. 1939 and owned by a Dane named Hagedorn.

In the 1950s, one Monarch (G-AIDE) enjoyed some success as a racer in the hands of W.P. Bowles

For the most part, the remaining Monarchs led uneventful but useful careers; a number survived into the Sixties.  G-AFJU is displayed at the National Museum of Flight at RAF East Fortune near East Linton, Scotland.

Sporting successes (G-AIDE)
1st - Goodyear Trophy (1957)
3rd - King's Cup Race (1957)
1st - Norton Griffiths Trophy (1958)
2nd - Osram Cup Race (1958)

Operators

Belgian Air Force - One aircraft only.

Royal Air Force

Specifications (M.17)

See also

References

Notes

Bibliography

 Amos, Peter. and Brown, Don Lambert. Miles Aircraft Since 1925, Volume 1. London: Putnam Aeronautical, 2000. .  
 Brown, Don Lambert. Miles Aircraft Since 1925. London: Putnam & Company Ltd., 1970. . 
 Jackson, A.J. British Civil Aircraft since 1919, Volume 3. London: Putnam & Company Ltd., 1974. ISBN 
 Jackson, A.J. British Civil Aircraft 1919–1972: Volume III. London: Putnam, 1988. .

1930s British civil utility aircraft
1930s British military utility aircraft
Monarch
Aircraft first flown in 1938